Intercept! is the fourth studio album from the English electronic music duo Bent. The track Leavin' Me contains a sample of Anne Murray's song Bidin' My Time from her album This Way Is My Way/Honey Wheat.

Track listing
"Exercise 7" – 4:44
"To Be Loved" – 4:24
"Stay Out All Night" – 4:40
"Breakfast at 80,000 Ft." – 3:16
"Tired of the Show" – 3:54
"Wendy Darling" – 1:28
"Waiting for You" – 5:20
"As Seen from Space" – 2:28
"The Handbrake" – 5:16
"Leavin' Me" – 5:53
"After All the Love" – 4:30

Personnel
 Bent (Simon Mills, Neil Tolliday) - production, instruments
 Rachel Foster - vocals (track 3)
 Simon Lord - vocals, (tracks: 2, 5, 7, 9, 11) guitar (track 5)
 Pino Palladino - bass (tracks: 5, 6)

References

Bent (band) albums
2006 albums